Farah or Farrah is a feminine and occasionally masculine given name in Arabic, Persian or Urdu.

Arabic
Farah (Arabic: فَرَح , faraḥ) is an Arabic female given name and sometimes male given name meaning "happiness, joy, gladness,  gleefulness, joyful, joyfulness, merriment, rejoice"

The name is based on the Arabic root ف ر ح (f-r-ḥ), variants from the root are:

 Faruh/ Farouh (Arabic: فَرُوح, farūḥ) - male given name
 Farhat/ Farhaat (Arabic: فَرْحَات, farḥāt) - male given name (but the written form is in the female plural form), the female form below is Farhah.
 Farhan/ Farhaan (Arabic: فَرْحَان, farḥān) - male given name
 Afrah/ Afraah (Arabic: أَفْرَاح, afrāḥ) - female given name in the plural or superlative form
 Fariha/ Fareeha (Arabic: فَرِيحَة, farīḥah) - female given name
 Farhah (Arabic: فَرْحَة, farḥah) - female given name, the female form of Farhaat above
 Farhah/ Faarhah (Arabic: فَارْحَة, fārḥah) - gender-neutral form, uncommonly used
 Farah/ Faarah (Arabic: فَارَح, fāraḥ) - gender-neutral form, uncommonly used

Persian 
Farah (Arabic: فَرَح , faraḥ), the same as the Arabic meaning as mentioned above. 

Farrah/ Khwarrah (Pahlavi: xwarrah) or Khvaraenah, in Avestan or Pahlavi meaning 'glory'. The Avestan or Pahlavi word-name used in Zoroastrian texts or name and is completely different from the Arabic.

People with the given name

Farah
 Farah (actress), Indian actress
 Farah Zeynep Abdullah, Turkish actress
 Farah Damji (born 1966), British criminal
 Farah Fath (born 1984), American actress 
 Farah Guled 3rd Grand Sultan of the Isaaq clan
 Farah Hussein (born 2001), Egyptian gymnast
 Farah Ali Jama, Somali economist and politician
 Farah Khan (born 1965), Indian choreographer and director
 Farah Mendlesohn, British academic
 Farah Nur warrior and poet of the Isaaq clan
 Farah Pahlavi (born 1938), Iranian empress consort
 Farah Shah, Pakistani actress and host

Farrah
 Farrah Abraham (born 1991), American television personality
 Farrah Fawcett (1947–2009), American actress
 Farrah Franklin (born 1981), American singer
 Farrah Forke (born 1968), American actress
 Farrah Hall (born 1981), American sports sailor
 Farrah Moan (born 1993), American drag queen and entertainer
 Farrah Yousef (born 1989), Syrian singer

People with the surname

Farah
 Abdulrahim Abby Farah (1919–2018), Somali diplomat and politician
 Caesar E. Farah (1929–2009), American scholar and historian
 Cynthia Farah (born 1949), American writer and photographer
 Elias Farah (1928–2013), Syrian writer and thinker
 Hassan Farah 3rd Grand Sultan of the Isaaq Somali clan
 Hassan Abshir Farah (1945–2020), Somali politician
 Joseph Farah (born 1954), American journalist and writer
 Kenza Farah (born 1986), French-Algerian singer
 Martha Farah (born 1955), American psychologist
 Mo Farah (born 1983), Somali-British track and field athlete
 Nuruddin Farah (born 1945), Somali writer
 Robbie Farah (born 1984), Australian rugby league footballer
 Robert Farah (tennis) (born 1987), Colombian tennis player

Farrah
 Abd'Elkader Farrah (1926–2005), Algerian painter and stage designer
 Georges Farrah (born 1957), Canadian politician
 John Farrah (1849–1907), British grocer, confectioner, biologist and meteorologist
 Pat Farrah, American retail executive
 Shamek Farrah, American saxophone player

Fictional characters
 Farah, a character in the American television series Sleeper Cell, played by Sarah Shahi
 Farah Black, a character in the American television series Dirk Gently's Holistic Detective Agency, played by Jade Eshete
 Farah, a character in the video game series Prince of Persia
 Farah Oersted, a character in the video game Tales of Eternia
 Fareeha Amari, known as Pharah, a character in the videogame Overwatch
 Farah Karim, a character in the video game Call of Duty: Modern Warfare (2019)

See also
 
 
 Pharah, a character in the  Overwatch video game

Surnames of Somali origin

References

Arabic feminine given names
Unisex given names